Igor Yevgenyevich Livanov (born November 15, 1953, Kiev, Ukrainian SSR, USSR) is a Soviet and Russian film and theater actor. Meritorious Artist of the Russian Federation (2004). Younger brother of  actor Aristarkh Livanov.

Biography
Igor was born on November 15, 1953, in Kiev.

Mother   Nina Timofeevna Livanova, father   Yevgeny Aristarkhovich Livanov. Parents were heads of theatrical puppet club in the House of Pioneers of the October District in Kiev. Older brother   Aristarkh   (born March 17, 1947). Since fifth grade, Igor has been boxing.

After leaving school I went to Leningrad. Entered LGITMiK on  course of Igor Gorbachyov, who graduated in 1975. Since 1976 he was in active military service in the Soviet Army.

From 1986 to 1988 he led the actors workshop at the Rostov College of Arts. He worked in the Moscow Experimental Theater at the invitation of his namesake, artistic director of the theater Vasily Livanov. Now  in the troupe of the Moscow Moon Theatre   of Sergei Prokhanov.

In  cinema  Livanov made his debut in 1979 as Nikolai Torsuev in the Soviet lyrical drama  Unrequited Love  directed by Andrei Malyukov. His partners in this film were famous Soviet actors Leonid Markov and Inna Makarova.

In 2003, he participated in the reality show Last Hero 3.

Selected filmography
 Mercedes Is Getting Away From The Chase as  Sasha Ermolenko, translator (1980)
 The Astrologer as  Kurt Rothenberg (1986)
 Terminate the Thirtieth! as  Savely Govorkov (1992)
 At the corner, at the Patriarch Ponds as  Sergey Vasilievich Nikolsky, police officer (1995-2004, TV Series)
 A Play for a Passenger as  Nikolay (1995)
 La Dame de Monsoreau as  d'Antrague (1997, TV Series)
 Empire under Attack as  Putilovsky (2000, miniseries)
 72 Meters as  Captain Nikolai  Konovalenko (2004)
 Vangelia as  Hitler (2013, TV Series)
 The Embassy as  Alexey Prokofiev, Ambassador of the Russian Federation in Caledonia (2018, TV Series)

Personal life
The first wife Tatyana Piskunova and daughter Olga died tragically in Kamensk-Shakhtinsky rail disaster.

The second wife Irina is a former student Igor from Volgodonsk. They had a son, Andrei   (1989 —  2015). In 2000, the marriage broke up, Irina went to the actor Sergey Bezrukov.

Currently Igor's wife is Olga (born in 1978). The couple have two children.

References

External links
 

1953 births
Living people
Actors from Kyiv
Soviet male film actors
Soviet male stage actors
Russian male film actors
Russian male television actors
Russian male stage actors
Honored Artists of the Russian Federation
Russian State Institute of Performing Arts alumni